The Brazilian Archives of Biology and Technology is a continuous peer-reviewed scientific journal covering all areas of fundamental and applied biology. It was established in 1946 as the Arquivos de Biologia e Tecnologia, publishing in Portuguese. It obtained its current name in 1998, when it switched to publication in English only.

Abstracting and indexing 
The journal is abstracted and indexed in:

According to the Journal Citation Reports, the journal has a 2021 impact factor of 1.18.

References

External links 
 

Biology journals
English-language journals
Bimonthly journals
Publications established in 1949